Edward J. Larson (born 1953) is an American lawyer and historian. Edward Larson may also refer to:

G. Edward Larson (1920–1994), U.S. government worker
Edward Larson (Kansas judge) (born 1932), Justice of the Kansas Supreme Court

See also
Edward Lawson (disambiguation)